Das Narayandas is an American economist currently the Edsel Bryant Ford Professor of Business Administration at Harvard Business School.

References

Year of birth missing (living people)
Living people
Harvard Business School faculty
American economists